Kvarterets olycksfågel is a 1947 Swedish drama film directed by Per G. Holmgren.

Cast
 Wiktor Andersson as Olsson
 Lillemor Appelgren as Britt
 Per-Axel Arosenius as Constable
 Tord Bernheim as Kalle's stepfather
 Astrid Bodin as Berra's mother
 Artur Cederborgh as Man who needs his shoes shined
 David Erikson as Axel Pettersson
 Arthur Fischer as Teacher
 Barbro Flodquist as Kalle's mother
 Erik Forslund as Pettersson's helper
 Sven-Eric Gamble as Hasse Ström

References

External links
 

1947 films
1947 drama films
Swedish drama films
Swedish black-and-white films
1940s Swedish-language films
1940s Swedish films